Krystle D'Souza (born 1 March 1990) is an Indian actress who mainly works in Hindi television. She made her acting debut in 2007 with the role of Kinjal Pandey in Kahe Naa Kahe and had her breakthrough with Ek Hazaaron Mein Meri Behna Hai where she portrayed Jeevika Vadhera.

D'Souza is best known for her portrayal of Sakshi Modi in Ek Nayi Pehchaan, Raina Sharma in Brahmarakshas and Roopa Awasthi in Belan Wali Bahu. She made her web debut with Fittrat in 2019 and film debut with Chehre in 2021.

Early life
D'Souza was born on 1 March 1990 in Mumbai into a Christian family. She considers herself deeply religious.

Career
D'Souza started her acting career in college, and then was cast for Kahe Naa Kahe in 2007. She then appeared in Kya Dill Mein Hai as Tamanna. In 2008, she appeared in Star Plus's Kasturi as Navneet and Kis Desh Mein Hai Meraa Dil as Veera.

In 2010, D'Souza appeared in Sony TV's Baat Hamari Pakki Hai as Tara. She also had a cameo appearance in Sony TV's Aahat and played Yamini in the same year.

In 2011, she portrayed Jeevika Vadhera in Ek Hazaaron Mein Meri Behna Hai opposite Karan Tacker. The show went off air on 13 September 2013.

In December 2013, she signed Sony TV's Ekk Nayi Pehchaan, playing Sakshi opposite Karan Sharma. The show went off the air in September 2014.

In 2016, she returned to television playing Raina in Ekta Kapoor's Brahmarakshas which aired on Zee TV. The show went off air in February 2017. In February 2017, she appeared in Lakme Fashion Week.

In 2018, D'Souza played Roopa in Colors TV's Belan Wali Bahu. For her performance, she won the Gold Award for Best Actress in Comic Role.

Currently, she is seen in ALT Balaji's Fittrat.

She also appeared in Colors TV's Mirchi Top 20 opposite Karan Tacker in 2015, 2016 & 2017.

In the media
D'Souza was ranked 19th in the 50 Sexiest Asian Women List by Eastern Eye in 2013. She was also listed 5th in the Top 20 Most Desirable Women on Indian Television 2017 by Times of India.

Filmography

Television

Films

Web series

Music videos

Awards and nominations

References

External links

 
 

Living people
1987 births
Indian soap opera actresses
Indian television actresses
Actresses from Mumbai
Actresses in Hindi television
21st-century Indian actresses
Indian Christians